Riverbend is a residential neighbourhood in the southeast quadrant of Calgary, Alberta.  It is bounded to the north by Glenmore Trail, to the east by 24 Street E and to the west by Deerfoot Trail.  It is developed in the Bow River floodplain, on its escarpment and the upland plain.

Riverbend was established as a neighbourhood in 1982.  It is represented in the Calgary City Council by the Ward 9 councillor.

Demographics 

Residents in this community had a median household income of $78,574 in 2000, and there were 6.1% low income residents living in the neighbourhood. As of 2000, 17.3% of the residents were immigrants. A proportion of 2.5% of the buildings were condominiums or apartments, and 3.5% of the housing was used for renting.

Education
This neighbourhood has one public elementary school: Riverbend Elementary School (K-6), and one Catholic school: Holy Angels Elementary School. (K-6)

See also 
 List of neighbourhoods in Calgary

References

External links 
 Riverbend Community Association

Neighbourhoods in Calgary